The Eagle is the name of the following daily newspapers:

 The Eagle (Hennessey, Oklahoma)
 The Eagle, Washington, D.C., American University student newspaper
 The Eagle, Plymouth, Michigan
 The Berkshire Eagle, Pittsfield, Massachusetts
 Brooklyn Eagle (1841–1955), Brooklyn, New York
 The Bryan-College Station Eagle, Bryan, Texas
 Butler Eagle, Butler, Pennsylvania
 Dothan Eagle, Dothan, Alabama
 Reading Eagle, Reading, Pennsylvania
 The Wichita Eagle, Wichita, Kansas

See also
 California Eagle (1879–1964), an African-American newspapers in Los Angeles, California 
 Eagle Newspapers (New York), a newspaper publisher
 Eagle Newspapers (Oregon), a newspaper publisher